The Alabama Hall of Fame was established by Act of Alabama No. 646 (1951) to recognize "worthy citizens of the state who rendered outstanding service or who won fame on account of their achievements as to make them exceptional in the history of Alabama". Its membership consists of people considered to be instrumental to the history of the state of Alabama, as selected by a nine-member board. The board was dissolved in 1990. The Hall of Fame plaques are located at the Alabama Department of Archives and History.

Inductees

See also
Alabama Academy of Honor

References

External links
 Alabama Department of Archives and History

Hall of Fame
Halls of fame in Alabama
State halls of fame in the United States
1951 establishments in Alabama
Awards established in 1951
Awards disestablished in 1990